Bucculatrix bifida is a moth in the family Bucculatricidae. It was described by Svetlana Seksjaeva in 1989. It is found in the Russian Far East (Primorsky Krai).

References

Natural History Museum Lepidoptera generic names catalog

Bucculatricidae
Moths described in 1989
Moths of Asia